The Soure train crash occurred on 31 July 2020 when a high-speed passenger train collided with a track maintenance vehicle at , Portugal. Two people were killed and 43 were injured, three seriously.

Accident
On the day of the accident, the maintenance vehicle ( - VCC) No. 105, belonging to Infraestruturas de Portugal, was circulating between Entroncamento and Mangualde with two crew members on board while not carrying out maintenance. Around 15:12, it stopped at a Soure station siding, to allow Alfa Pendular train 4005 to overtake it. The Alfa Pendular train was travelling from Lisbon to Braga, calling at Coimbra and Oporto.

The crew of the maintenance vehicle likely mistook the green signal meant for the Alfa Pendular train as applying to the siding it was stopped at, and the vehicle resumed its course at 15:25, passing a red signal and entering track I, which would soon be occupied by train 4005. As the track became occupied by the maintenance vehicle, the track I signal changed to red and the Alfa Pendular's brakes were activated, but due to the short distance between the two vehicles, this was not sufficient to avoid the collision, which happened around 15:26, about 20 seconds after the maintenance vehicle entered the line.

Due to the violence of the collision, the first two carriages were derailed and the maintenance vehicle was dragged for some 500 meters, after which both vehicles came to a halt.

The alert was given some short minutes after the crash, and fire brigades from surrounding cities responded. The rescue operations were backed by 225 first responders and 85 emergency vehicles, as well as 2 helicopters.

Two people were killed and 43 were injured, three seriously. The two casualties were the crew members aboard the maintenance vehicle. The Alfa Pendular train was severely damaged and VCC No. 105 was destroyed. Two rescue helicopters and 163 rescue personnel were sent to the scene, where a field hospital was established. That section of the Linha do Norte was suspended and Comboios de Portugal organized a rail replacement bus during the time the track was closed. Circulation on the southbound track resumed at 01:45 on the 2nd of August, 2020, with heavy speed restrictions. At 09:00 of the same day, the northbound track was reopened.

Investigation and aftermath

The Gabinete de Prevenção e Investigação de Acidentes com Aeronaves e de Acidentes Ferroviários (GPIAAF) opened an investigation into the accident. The investigation's final report was released on 29 September 2021.

In the wake of this accident, the absence of automatic train protection (ATP) in maintenance vehicles was scrutinized. It came to light that, in 2018, after several events where such vehicles passed signals at danger, GPIAAF recommended that IP reassess the possibility of equipping these vehicles with ATP and act to ensure train driving qualifications of their maintenance staff. IP agreed to install ATP, but this was met with difficulties in sourcing CONVEL-compatible equipment from Bombardier.

While the suspected cause is human error — the driver passing the signal at danger — ATP would have prevented this accident by braking the maintenance vehicle. Its incursion into the reserved block was, however, detected by the track circuit and signals were updated accordingly, but the passenger train had already passed the previous signal and balise, and proceeded at top speed expecting a clear track ahead.

References

Railway accidents in 2020
Train collisions in Portugal
Derailments in Portugal
2020 in Portugal
2020 disasters in Portugal